Laura Smith (March 1882 – February 1932) was an American classic female blues and country blues singer. Songs she recorded include "Gonna Put You Right in Jail" and her version of "Don't You Leave Me Here". She led Laura Smith and her Wild Cats and also worked with Clarence Williams and Perry Bradford. Details of her life outside the music industry are scanty.

Biography
The researchers Bob Eagle and Eric LeBlanc state that she was born Loretta Bryant in Illinois in 1882. Other sources suggest that she was born in Indianapolis, Indiana, at an unknown date. In the early 1920s, she toured the Theater Owners Bookers Association circuit. Her recording career started in 1924 with Okeh and ended just three years later, when she recorded some tracks for Victor. The music journalist Scott Yanow noted that her earliest recordings were her strongest: "by the time she recorded 'Don't You Leave Me Here' in 1927, much of the power was gone". Her recordings include two songs, "The Mississippi Blues" and "Lonesome Refugee", about the Great Mississippi Flood of 1927. She recorded a total of 35 songs.

It was reported that by 1926 Smith was married to Slim Jones, a comedian, and was living in Baltimore.

Her most notable number, "Don't You Leave Me Here", was made more famous in a version recorded by Jelly Roll Morton some ten years later.

Smith died of long-term effects of hypertension in February 1932 in Los Angeles.

All her available recordings have been released on CD by Document Records (see below).

She was unrelated to the singers Mamie Smith, Bessie Smith, Clara Smith and Trixie Smith. She is also not to be confused with the Canadian folk singer-songwriter Laura Smith.

Discography

Compilation albums

See also
List of classic female blues singers
List of country blues musicians

References

External links
Biography and discography

1882 births
1932 deaths
American blues singers
Classic female blues singers
Country blues singers
Musicians from Indianapolis
Okeh Records artists
20th-century American singers
20th-century American women singers